The G Filez is the third solo studio album by American rapper Celly Cel. It was released on July 14, 1998 through Sick Wid It/Jive Records. Production was handled by G-Man Stan, Sam Bostic, Spliff, Studio Ton, Tone Capone, K-Lou, Mark D, Mike Mosley, ProHoeZak, Quincy Jones III, Rick Rock, Sean T and Celly Cel himself, with co-producer Don Juan, and executive producers E-40 and B-Legit. It features guest appearances from E-40, B-Legit, C-Bo, Chill, Keak da Sneak, L.I.T., Mac Reese, Mack 10, Messy Marv, Mugzi, Rappin' 4-Tay, San Quinn, Silkk the Shocker, UGK, Miss Mocha, Otis & Shug. The album peaked at number 53 on the Billboard 200 and number 17 on the Top R&B/Hip-Hop Albums chart. The album spawned three singles, "Fuck tha World", "Get a Real Job" and "Pop the Trunk".

Track listing

Charts

References

External links

1998 albums
Celly Cel albums
Sick Wid It Records albums
Albums produced by Rick Rock
Albums produced by Studio Ton
Albums produced by Quincy Jones III